Lance Michael Kerwin (November 6, 1960 – January 24, 2023) was an American actor, known primarily for roles in television and film during his childhood and teen years in the 1970s.  He played lead roles in the TV series James at 15, and the made-for-TV films The Loneliest Runner and Salem's Lot.

Early life and career
Kerwin was raised in Lake Elsinore, California. His father, Don Kerwin, was an acting coach, who brought home scripts for his son to read. His mother, Lois, was also a performer and later, a talent agent. He was the youngest of five brothers. His brother Shane was his stand-in.

In the 1970s, Kerwin appeared in a number of made-for-TV movies and series. He was, said former theater critic and British Film Institute governor John Holmstrom, "probably America's leading boy actor of the late Seventies ... a handsome lad ... [with] considerable sensitivity as an actor". His serious acting roles often portrayed anguished characters facing difficult challenges, such as in The Loneliest Runner, The Boy Who Drank Too Much, and Children of Divorce.

In 1985, he co-starred in the "Snow Queen", a retelling of Hans Christian Andersen's classic tale in an episode of Shelly Duvall's children's television series, Faerie Tale Theatre, alongside Melissa Gilbert, Lee Remick, and Lauren Hutton.

Personal life and death
Kerwin had a daughter, Savanah Paige, with Kristen Lansdale, and four children with his wife Yvonne Kerwin. He gave up acting in the mid-1990s, but returned to the screen in 2022 for The Wind & the Reckoning, filmed in Hawaii.

In July 2010, it was reported that Kerwin was working as a pastor at Calvary Chapel in Kapaa, Hawaii, and a program leader at U-Turn for Christ, a drug and alcohol rehabilitation organization. The report also stated that Kerwin and his wife Yvonne pleaded guilty to falsifying documents to obtain state medical assistance in Hawaii, after neglecting to report his ownership of three properties on the mainland. Kerwin was sentenced to five years probation and 300 hours of community service. He publicly apologized.

Kerwin died in San Clemente, California, on January 24, 2023, at the age of 62.

Filmography

References

External links

1960 births
2023 deaths
20th-century American male actors
American male child actors
American male film actors
American male television actors
Calvary Chapel Association
Criminals from California
Male actors from Newport Beach, California
People from Lake Elsinore, California